HMS Prevost

  was a 12-gun schooner purchased in 1803 in the Leeward Islands; on 31 August 1806 the French privateer Austerlitz captured her.

See also

 , later HMS Wolfe and then HMS Montreal
 , later USS Lady Prevost
 , a Canadian Naval Reserve unit